Sarab-e Shahbaz (also Romanized as Sarāb-e Shahbāz; also known as Sarāb-e Shahnāz) is a village in Honam Rural District, in the Central District of Selseleh County, Lorestan Province, Iran. At the 2006 census, its population was 33, in 10 families.

References 

Towns and villages in Selseleh County